Carl Bailey (born April 23, 1958) is a retired American basketball player who played one career game in the National Basketball Association (NBA). Born in Birmingham, Alabama, he attended Tuskegee University in Tuskegee, Alabama.

He was selected by the Seattle SuperSonics in the 3rd round (66th overall pick) of the 1980 NBA draft but was waived before the start of the season. He spent the 1980–1981 season with the Alberta Dusters before signing again with the Sonics in June 1981. He appeared in four preseason games for the Sonics but was waived again before the start of the regular season.

In March 1982, Bailey signed with the Portland Trail Blazers. He appeared in one game for the Blazers with the, scoring two points in seven minutes of action.

References

External links

1958 births
Living people
Alberta Dusters players
American expatriate basketball people in Canada
American men's basketball players
Basketball players from Birmingham, Alabama
Billings Volcanos players
Centers (basketball)
Las Vegas Silvers players
Portland Trail Blazers players
Seattle SuperSonics draft picks
Tuskegee Golden Tigers men's basketball players
Wisconsin Flyers players